The 1996 Liga Sudamericana de Básquetbol, or 1996 FIBA South American League, was the first edition of the second-tier tournament for professional basketball clubs from South America. The tournament began on 6 February 1996 and finished on 1 May 1996. Argentine club Olimpia won the tournament, defeating Brazilian club Corinthians in the Grand Finals.

Format
Teams were split into four groups of four teams each and played each other in a home-and-away round-robin format. The top two teams from each group advanced to the final stage, a best-of-three direct playoff elimination where the champion was decided.

Teams

Group stage

Group A

Group B

Group C

Group D

Final stage

Finals rosters
Olimpia de Venado Tuerto: Alejandro Montecchia , Walter Guiñazú, Jorge Racca, Michael Wilson, Todd Jadlow - Sebastián Uranga, Lucas Victoria, Leonardo Gutiérrez. Coach: Horacio Segui 

Corinthians: James Carter, Fernando Minucci, Oscar Schmidt, Mingão, Rich Mclver. Coach: Flor Meléndez 

Season MVP: Jorge Racca

References

1996 South American League for Men's Clubs, FIBA Archive. Retrieved 18 May 2018.

Liga Sudamericana
1996